A submersible is a watercraft designed to operate underwater. The term "submersible" is often used to differentiate from other underwater vessels known as submarines, in that a submarine is a fully self-sufficient craft, capable of independent cruising with its own power supply and air renewal system, whereas a submersible is usually supported by a nearby surface vessel, platform, shore team or sometimes a larger submarine. In common usage by the general public, however, the word "submarine" may be used to describe a craft that is by the technical definition actually a submersible, and by the standard meaning of the word, all submarines are submersibles.

There are many types of submersibles, including both crewed and uncrewed craft, otherwise known as remotely operated vehicles (ROVs) or unmanned underwater vehicles (UUVs). Submersibles have many uses worldwide, such as oceanography, underwater archaeology, ocean exploration, adventure, equipment maintenance and recovery, and underwater videography.

History

The first recorded self-propelled underwater vessel was designed and built by Dutch inventor Cornelis Drebbel in 1620, with two more built in the following four years. Contemporary accounts state that the final model was demonstrated to King James I in person and that the monarch himself was taken aboard for a test dive, although more recently, these accounts have been called into question as an exaggeration. There do not appear to have been any further recorded submersibles until Bushnell's Turtle

The first submersible to be used in war was designed and built by American inventor David Bushnell in 1775 as a means to attach explosive charges to enemy ships during the American Revolutionary War. The device, dubbed Bushnell's Turtle, was an oval-shaped vessel of wood and brass. It had tanks that were filled with water to make it dive and then emptied with the help of a hand pump to make it return to the surface. The operator used two hand-cranked propellers to move vertically or laterally under the water. The vehicle had small glass windows on top and naturally luminescent wood affixed to its instruments so that they could be read in the dark.

Bushnell's Turtle was first set into action on September 7, 1776, at New York Harbor to attack the British flagship HMS Eagle. Sergeant Ezra Lee operated the vehicle at that time. Lee successfully brought the Turtle against the underside of Eagles hull but failed to attach the charge because of the strong water currents.

Operation
Apart from size, the main technical difference between a "submersible" and a "submarine" is that submersibles are not fully autonomous and may rely on a support facility or vessel for replenishment of power and breathing gases. Submersibles typically have shorter range, and operate primarily underwater, as most have little function at the surface. Some submersibles operate on a "tether" or "umbilical", remaining connected to a tender (a submarine, surface vessel or platform).

Submersibles may be relatively small, hold only a small crew, and have no living facilities.

A submersible often has very dexterous mobility, provided by propeller screws or pump-jets.

Technologies

There are five basic technologies used in the design of submersibles. Single atmosphere submersibles have a pressure hull with internal pressure maintained at surface atmospheric pressure. This requires the hull to be capable of withstanding the ambient hydrostatic pressure from the water outside that can be many times greater than the internal pressure.

Another technology called ambient pressure submersibles maintains the same pressure both inside and outside the vessel. The interior is air-filled, at a pressure to balance the external pressure, so the hull does not have to withstand a pressure difference.

A third technology is the "wet sub", which refers to a vehicle that may or may not be enclosed, but in either case, water floods the interior so underwater breathing equipment is used by the crew. This may be scuba carried by the divers, or scuba carried by the vessel.

Buoyancy control 
During underwater operation a submersible will generally be neutrally buoyant, but may use positive or negative buoyancy to facilitate vertical motion. Negative buoyancy may also be useful at times to settle the vessel on the bottom, and positive buoyancy is necessary to float the vessel at the surface. Fine buoyancy adjustments may be made using variable buoyancy pressure vessel as a trim tank. and gross changes of buoyancy at or near the surface may use ambient pressure ballast tanks, which are fully flooded during underwater operations. Some submersibles use high density external ballast which may be released at depth in an emergency to make the vessel sufficiently buoyant to float back to the surface even if all power is lost, or to travel faster vertically.

Deep-diving crewed submersibles

Some submersibles have been able to dive to great depths.

China, with its Jiaolong project in 2002, was the fifth country to send a man 3,500 meters below sea level, following the US, France, Russia and Japan. On June 22, 2012, the Jiaolong submersible set a deep-diving record for state-owned vessels when the three-person sub descended  into the Pacific Ocean.

Alvin is owned by the United States Navy and operated by WHOI, and as of 2011 had made over 4,400 dives.

James Cameron made a record-setting, crewed submersible dive to the bottom of Challenger Deep, the deepest known point of the Mariana Trench on March 26, 2012.

Commercial submersibles
More recently, private firms such as Florida based Triton Submarines, LLC. SEAmagine Hydrospace, Sub Aviator Systems (or 'SAS'), and Netherlands-based U-Boat Worx have developed small submersibles for tourism, exploration and adventure travel. A Canadian company in British Columbia called Sportsub has been building personal recreational submersibles since 1986 with open-floor designs (partially flooded cockpits).

MROVs

Small uncrewed submersibles called "marine remotely operated vehicles" or MROVs are widely used today to work in water too deep or too dangerous for divers.

Remotely operated vehicles (ROVs) repair offshore oil platforms and attach cables to sunken ships to hoist them. Such remotely operated vehicles are attached by an umbilical cable (a thick cable providing power and communications) to a control center on a ship. Operators on the ship see video and/or sonar images sent back from the ROV and remotely control its thrusters and manipulator arm. The wreck of the Titanic was explored by such a vehicle, as well as by a crewed vessel.

See also

Sources

External links

Submarines
Ship types
Research submarines